The Women's 200m T13 had its competition held on September 13, with the first round at 9:45 and the Final at 18:45.

Medalists

Results

References
Round 1 - Heat 1
Round 1 - Heat 2
Final

Athletics at the 2008 Summer Paralympics
2008 in women's athletics